Nemoroso Riquelme (born 2 October 1906, date of death unknown) was a Chilean fencer. He competed in the team sabre event at the 1928 Summer Olympics.

References

External links
 

1906 births
Year of death missing
Chilean male sabre fencers
Olympic fencers of Chile
Fencers at the 1928 Summer Olympics
20th-century Chilean people